The mount Flat Top is a mountain in administrative region of Estrie, in Quebec, in Canada. It is part of Appalachian Mountains; its altitude is 830 meters.

Geography 
The mountain is located in the municipality of Frontenac, in zec Louise-Gosford, east of lac aux Araignées, between Merrill Mountain and Moose Hill. It overlooks the rivière aux Araignées, as well as the lac aux Araignées.

Toponymy 
The toponym "Mont Flat Top" was formalized on December 5, 1968 by the Commission de toponymie du Québec.

Notes and references 

Appalachian summits
Summits of Estrie
Le Granit Regional County Municipality
Mountains of Quebec under 1000 metres